In mathematics, particularly in order theory, a pseudocomplement is one generalization of the notion of complement. In a lattice L with bottom element 0, an element x ∈ L is said to have a pseudocomplement if there exists a greatest element x* ∈ L with the property that x ∧ x* = 0. More formally, x* = max{ y ∈ L | x ∧ y = 0 }. The lattice L itself is called a pseudocomplemented lattice if every element of L is pseudocomplemented. Every pseudocomplemented lattice is necessarily bounded, i.e. it has a 1 as well. Since the pseudocomplement is unique by definition (if it exists), a pseudocomplemented lattice can be endowed with a unary operation * mapping every element to its pseudocomplement; this structure is sometimes called a p-algebra. However this latter term may have other meanings in other areas of mathematics.

Properties
In a p-algebra L, for all 
 The map x ↦ x* is antitone. In particular, 0* = 1 and 1* = 0.
 The map x ↦ x** is a closure. 
 x* = x***.
 (x∨y)* = x* ∧ y*.
 (x∧y)** = x** ∧ y**.

The set S(L) ≝ { x** | x ∈ L } is called the skeleton of L.  S(L) is a ∧-subsemilattice of L and together with x ∪ y = (x∨y)** = (x* ∧ y*)* forms a Boolean algebra (the complement in this algebra is *). In general, S(L) is not a sublattice of L. In a distributive p-algebra, S(L) is the set of complemented elements of L.

Every element x with the property x* = 0 (or equivalently, x** = 1) is called dense. Every element of the form x ∨ x* is dense. D(L), the set of all the dense elements in L is a filter of L. A distributive p-algebra is Boolean if and only if D(L) = {1}.

Pseudocomplemented lattices form a variety; indeed, so do pseudocomplemented semilattices.

Examples 
 Every finite distributive lattice is pseudocomplemented.
 Every Stone algebra is pseudocomplemented. In fact, a Stone algebra can be defined as a pseudocomplemented distributive lattice L in which any of the following equivalent statements hold for all 
 S(L) is a sublattice of L;
 (x∧y)* = x* ∨ y*;
 (x∨y)** = x** ∨ y**;
 x* ∨ x** = 1.
 Every Heyting algebra is pseudocomplemented.
 If X is a topological space, the (open set) topology on X is a pseudocomplemented (and distributive) lattice with the meet and join being the usual union and intersection of open sets. The pseudocomplement of an open set A is the interior of the set complement of A. Furthermore, the dense elements of this lattice are exactly the dense open subsets in the topological sense.

Relative pseudocomplement 
A relative pseudocomplement of a with respect to b is a maximal element c such that a∧c≤b. This binary operation is denoted a→b. A lattice with the pseudocomplement for each two elements is called implicative lattice, or Brouwerian lattice. In general, an implicative lattice may not have a minimal element. If such a minimal element exists, then each pseudocomplement a* could be defined using relative pseudocomplement as a → 0.

See also

References 

Lattice theory